The Journal of Children's Orthopaedics is a bimonthly peer-reviewed medical journal, which was first published in March 2007. It is the official journal of the European Paediatric Orthopaedic Society (EPOS) and is published in partnership with The British Editorial Society of Bone & Joint Surgery. The Journal of Children's Orthopaedics is a gold open access journal and hence articles published in the journal are available online to anyone, free of charge. Full-text content can also be accessed via PubMed Central.

The Journal of Children's Orthopaedics is published alongside the British Editorial Society of Bone & Joint Surgery's Bone & Joint series of journals, which includes The Bone & Joint Journal, Bone & Joint Research and Bone & Joint 360, and also EFORT Open Reviews (which is published in partnership with the European Federation of National Associations of Orthopaedics and Traumatology).

Abstracting and indexing
The journal is indexed in Scopus, the Emerging Sources Citation Index (via Web of Science) and also PubMed Central, which hosts full-text content of the complete archive.

According to the Journal Citation Reports, it has a 2019 impact factor of 1.075.

References

External links

English-language journals
Bimonthly journals
Orthopedics journals
Publications established in 2007